B roads are numbered routes in Great Britain of lesser importance than A roads. See the article Great Britain road numbering scheme for the rationale behind the numbers allocated.

Zone 1 (3 digits)

Zone 1 (4 digits)

1
 1